Nelson Dewey State Park is a  Wisconsin state park on the Mississippi River.  The land was once part of the Stonefield estate of Nelson Dewey, the state's first governor.

Activities and amenities
Trails: The park offers  of hiking trails with bluff-top views of the Mississippi River Valley.
Camping: The campground has 45 sites, four of them walk-in sites located along the top of the bluffs.

References

External links
Nelson Dewey State Park Wisconsin Department of Natural Resources

Protected areas of Grant County, Wisconsin
Protected areas on the Mississippi River
State parks of Wisconsin
Protected areas established in 1935
1935 establishments in Wisconsin